Mitar Pejović (born 1 November 1983) is a Serbian football goalkeeper who last played for Mačva Šabac.

References

External links
 

1983 births
Living people
People from Bor, Serbia
Association football goalkeepers
Serbian footballers
FK Zvezdara players
FK Srem players
FK Voždovac players
FK Mladi Radnik players
FK Metalac Gornji Milanovac players
FK Mačva Šabac players
Serbian First League players
Serbian SuperLiga players